Shuichiro Yoshino (born 28 September 1991) is a Japanese professional boxer, who has held the WBO Asia Pacific title since 2020. He is ranked as the world's 9th best active lightweight by BoxRec.

Professional boxing career

Early career
Yoshino made his professional debut against Chatri Charoensin on 14 December 2015. He won the fight by a third-round technical knockout. Yoshino next faced the 58-fight veteran Chaiyong Chanthahong on 11 February 2016. He won the fight by unanimous decision, with scores of 60–54, 60–54 and 59–55.

Yoshino face the former Japanese and OPBF lightweight champion Yoshitaka Kato on 13 April 2017. He won the fight by unanimous decision, with scores of 80–72, 77–75 and 78–75. Yoshino faced the overmatched Katika Piyawong on 10 August 2017. He made quick work of Katika, winning the bout by a second-round technical knockout.

Japanese lightweight champion
Yoshino was booked to face the veteran Spicy Matsushita for the vacant Japanese lightweight title on 21 October 2017. He won the fight by a seventh-round technical knockout. He was leading on two of the judges' scorecards at the time of the stoppage (58–56), while the third judge had the fight as an even 57–57.

Yoshino made his first Japanese lightweight title defense against Masaki Saito on 8 February 2018. He won the fight by a first-round technical knockout. Yoshino made his second title defense against Genki Maeda on 14 June 2018. He won the fight by a ninth-round knockout. Yoshino made his third title defense against Kazumasa Kobayashi on 13 December 2018. He won the fight by a third-round technical knockout. Yoshino made his fourth title defense against Accel Sumiyoshi on 11 April 2019. He won the fight by a seventh-round technical knockout.

Yoshino was booked to face Harmonito Dela Torre for the vacant WBO Asia Pacific and OPBF lightweight titles on 10 October 2019. He made quick work of Torre, as he won the fight by a first-round technical knockout. After capturing two regional titles, Yoshino made his fifth Japanese title defense against Izuki Tomioka on 13 February 2020. He won the fight by an eight-round technical knockout. Yoshino made the first defense of all three minor titles simultaneously on 3 September 2020, against Valentine Hosokawa. He won the fight by a dominant unanimous decision, with scores of 120–108, 119–109 and 119–109. It was his first decision victory since 13 April 2017. 

Yoshino made his seventh Japanese lightweight title defense against Shuma Nakazato on 12 August 2021, following an eleven-month absence from the sport. He won the fight by a sixth-round technical knockout. Yoshino was booked to defend his WBO Asia Pacific and OPBF titles against the former WBO junior lightweight champion Masayuki Ito on 9 April 2022. He won the fight by an eleventh-round technical decision, with scores of 106–103, 107–102, and 107–102.

Yoshino made his third WBO Asia Pacific title defense against Masayoshi Nakatani on 1 November 2022, on the undercard of the Kenshiro Teraji and Hiroto Kyoguchi light flyweight unification bout. He retained his title by a sixth-round knockout, after twice knocking Nakatani down.

On 11 January 2023, it was revealed that Yoshino had accepted an order from the WBC to face Shakur Stevenson in a lightweight title eliminator. Yoshino is scheduled to face Stevenson on 8 April 2023, at the Prudential Center in  Newark, New Jersey.

Professional boxing record

References

Living people
1991 births
Japanese male boxers
Sportspeople from Tochigi Prefecture
Lightweight boxers
20th-century Japanese people
21st-century Japanese people